The hydraulic diameter, is a commonly used term when handling flow in non-circular tubes and channels. Using this term, one can calculate many things in the same way as for a round tube. When the cross-section is uniform along the tube or channel length, it is defined as

where
 is the cross-sectional area of the flow,
 is the wetted perimeter of the cross-section.

More intuitively, the hydraulic diameter can be understood as a function of the hydraulic radius , which is defined as the cross-sectional area of the channel divided by the wetted perimeter. Here, the wetted perimeter includes all surfaces acted upon by shear stress from the fluid.

Note that for the case of a circular pipe,

The need for the hydraulic diameter arises due to the use of a single dimension in case of dimensionless quantity such as Reynolds number, which prefer a single variable for flow analysis rather than the set of variables as listed in the table below.[This sentence needs work] The Manning formula contains a quantity called the hydraulic radius. Despite what the name may suggest, the hydraulic diameter is not twice the hydraulic radius, but four times larger.

Hydraulic diameter is mainly used for calculations involving turbulent flow. Secondary flows can be observed in non-circular ducts as a result of turbulent shear stress in the turbulent flow. Hydraulic diameter is also used in calculation of heat transfer in internal-flow problems.

Non-uniform and non-circular cross-section channels
In the more general case, channels with non-uniform non-circular cross-sectional area, such as the Tesla valve, the hydraulic diameter is defined as:

where
 is the total wetted volume of the channel,
 is the total wetted surface area.

List of hydraulic diameters

For a fully filled duct or pipe whose cross-section is a regular polygon, the hydraulic diameter is equivalent to the diameter  of a circle inscribed within the wetted perimeter.
This can be seen as follows: The -sided regular polygon is a union of  triangles, each of height  and base .

for the hydraulic diameter.

References

See also
 Equivalent spherical diameter
 Hydraulic radius
 Darcy friction factor

Fluid dynamics
Heat transfer
Hydrology
Hydraulics